A list of all windmills and windmill sites which lie in the current ceremonial counties of Hampshire and the Isle of Wight.

Hampshire

Isle of Wight

Sources

Unless stated otherwise, the source for all entries is:

Maps
1607 John Norden
1611 John Speed
1645 Joan Blaeu
1675 John Ogilby
1759 Isaac Taylor

Notes

Mills in bold are still standing, and known building dates are also indicated in bold. Text in italics denotes indicates that the information is not confirmed, but is likely to be the case stated.

References

 
Windmills
Windmills
Hampshire and the Isle of Wight